The Misandrists is a 2017 English-language German drama film directed by Bruce LaBruce. It was screened in the Panorama section at the 67th Berlin International Film Festival.

The film centres on a radical feminist group plotting a revolution to overthrow patriarchy in Germany. It is thematically linked with LaBruce's shorter film Ulrike's Brain, which premiered in the Berlin Film Festival's Forum program in the same week.

Cast
 Susanne Sachße as Big Mother
 Viva Ruiz as Sister Dagmar
 Kembra Pfahler as Sister Kembra
 Caprice Crawford as Sister Barbara
 Grete Gehrke as Sister Grete

Reception
On the review aggregator Rotten Tomatoes, the film holds an approval rating of 71%, based on 38 reviews, with an average rating of 5.4/10. The website's critical consensus reads, "The Misandrists mounts a memorably gonzo assault on the patriarchy — one whose wild ambition and outré aesthetic are often enough to cover for its uneven execution." On Metacritic, the film has a weighted average score of 56 out of 100, based on 11 critics, indicating "mixed or average reviews".

References

External links
 

2017 films
2017 drama films
English-language German films
German drama films
Films directed by Bruce LaBruce
German LGBT-related films
2017 LGBT-related films
Lesbian feminism
Lesbian-related films
LGBT-related drama films
Radical feminism
Films set in Germany
2010s English-language films
2010s German films